KSDA-FM (91.9 FM) is the call sign for the radio station JOY FM broadcast at 91.9 FM from Agana Heights, in the United States territory of Guam.

KSDA began as "Adventist World Radio-Asia" (AWR-Asia) in 1987 and continues to broadcast on shortwave from Agat, Guam to various countries in Asia. In 1990, AWR launched a local FM station at 91.9 MHz. KSDA-FM first broadcast from AWR's Agat studio, and later from Agana Heights.

When AWR shifted its mission away from local broadcasting, KSDA-FM's operation was passed on to the church's Guam-Micronesia Mission in the early 1990s. In 2000, Good News Broadcasting Corporation (GNBC), a non-profit 501-c3 organization composed of members from various Adventist entities on Guam, received KSDA-FM's license from AWR.

The FM station was known as JOY 92 until mid-2008, when GNBC secured a construction permit for a transmitter on Saipan. The Saipan transmitter KORU rebroadcasts the Guam station on 89.9 MHz, necessitating the name change.

See also

 List of radio stations in Guam
 Media ministries of the Seventh-day Adventist Church

References

External links
 
 
 

SDA
Seventh-day Adventist media
Radio stations established in 1991
1991 establishments in Guam
Seventh-day Adventist Church in Oceania
Agat, Guam
Shortwave radio stations in the United States